Shih Po-yu (born 9 August 1996), also known as Patrick Shih is a Taiwanese actor and model. He is best known for his roles in the drama Someday Or One Day (2019).

Filmography

Television series

References

External links

 
 
 

1996 births
Living people
21st-century Taiwanese male actors
Taiwanese male television actors
Taiwanese male models
Fu Jen Catholic University alumni